The Senior President of Tribunals is a senior judge in the United Kingdom who presides over the UK tribunal system. The Senior President is appointed by the monarch of the United Kingdom on the advice of the Lord Chancellor following the recommendation of an independent selection panel under the auspices of the Judicial Appointments Commission. Lord Justice Carnwath was appointed as the first holder of the post on 12 November 2007. The Senior President must satisfy the judicial-appointment eligibility condition on a seven-year basis, or have had similar experience in Scotland or Northern Ireland. The Senior President must have regard to the need for the following:
Tribunals to be accessible
Proceedings before tribunals to be fair and handled quickly and efficiently
Members of tribunals to be experts in the subject-matter of, or the law to be applied in, cases in which they decide matters—and the need to develop innovative methods of resolving disputes that are of a type that may be brought before tribunals.

The Senior President of Tribunals can make representations to the Parliament of the United Kingdom about tribunal members and the administration of justice by tribunals. The Senior President can also represent the views of tribunal members to Parliament, the Lord Chancellor and government ministers.

List of Senior Presidents
 12 November 2007: Sir Robert Carnwath
 25 June 2012: Sir Jeremy Sullivan
 18 September 2015: Sir Ernest Ryder
 19 September 2020: Sir Keith Lindblom

See also
President of the Supreme Court of the United Kingdom

References

Judiciaries of the United Kingdom
2007 establishments in the United Kingdom
United Kingdom tribunals